Debauchery is a German death metal band from Stuttgart.

History 
Founded in 2000 as Maggotcunt before changing their name in 2002, Debauchery was formed by the current vocalist, guitarist and bass guitarist Thomas Gurrath and the former drummer Dani.

The band's themes are mainly war and death, often involving the fictional god Khorne from the science fiction universe Warhammer 40,000 and its followers.

Gurrath was formerly a philosophy teacher at a Stuttgart high school until his role in Debauchery was discovered in May 2010. He was given the choice between keeping his teaching job or his band, and chose the latter.

Members 

Current
 Thomas "The Bloodbeast" Gurrath – vocals, guitars
 Dennis "The Bloodpriest" Ward – bass guitar
 Oliver "The Bloodhammer" Zellmann – drums

Former
 Ronald Squier – drums
 Dani – drums

Additional musicians
 Tomasz – drums
 Joshi – guitars
 Simon Dorn – guitars
 Marc Juttner – bass guitar
 Thomas Naumann – guitars
 Günther Werno – keyboards

Discography 

 Kill Maim Burn, 2003
 Rage of the Bloodbeast, 2004
 Torture Pit, 2005
 Kill Maim Burn Re-Release, 2006
 Back in Blood, 2007
 Continue to Kill, 2008
 Rockers & War, 2009
 Germany's Next Death Metal, 2011
 Kings of Carnage, 2013
 Fuck Humanity, 2015
 Thunderbeast, 2016 (split)
 Enemy of Mankind, 2018
 Blood for the Blood God, 2019 (compilation)
 Monster Metal, 2021
 Demons of Rock 'n' Roll, 2022 (split)

References

External links 

Debauchery on Discogs
Debauchery at Metal Storm

German death metal musical groups
Musical groups established in 2000
German heavy metal musical groups
Groove metal musical groups